Roger Mills County is a county located in the western part of the U.S. state of Oklahoma. As of the 2010 census, the population was 3,647, making it the third-least populous county in Oklahoma. Its county seat is Cheyenne. The county was created in 1891.

Roger Mills county is located above the petroleum-rich Panhandle-Hugoton Field, making it one of the leading sources of oil, natural gas and helium. The county also overlies part of the Ogallala Aquifer.

History
Roger Mills County takes its name from Roger Q. Mills, a senator from Texas. The town of Cheyenne in Roger Mills County is the location of the Battle of Washita River (also called Battle of the Washita; Washita Battlefield and the Washita Massacre), where George Armstrong Custer’s 7th U.S. Cavalry attacked Chief Black Kettle’s Cheyenne village on the Washita River on November 26, 1868.

The area covered by Roger Mills County had been part of the Cheyenne Arapaho reservation until after Oklahoma Territory was created and County E  was formed. County E was renamed Day County. Day County was abolished and Roger Mills County was created at statehood on November 16, 1907. The county's western boundary with Texas was moved eastward  when the Supreme Court ruled that the 100th Meridian was farther east than originally supposed.

During the 1970s Roger Mills County and the surrounding area was the site of natural gas and oil development in the Panhandle-Hugoton Gas Field, the largest-volume gas field in the United States, and the world's largest known source of helium. Between 1973 and 1993 the field produced over 8-trillion cubic feet (230,000,000 m³) of gas.

Geography
The Canadian River forms the northern border of the county. The Washita River passes by Cheyenne and Strong City as it crosses the county from west to east. The historically significant Antelope Hills lie in the northeastern part of the county.

Major highways

  U.S. Highway 283
  State Highway 6
  State Highway 30
  State Highway 33
  State Highway 34
  State Highway 47
  State Highway 47A
  State Highway 152

Adjacent counties
 Ellis County (north)
 Dewey County (northeast)
 Custer County (east)
 Beckham County (south)
 Wheeler County, Texas (southwest)
 Hemphill County, Texas (northwest)

National protected areas
 Antelope Hills
 Black Kettle National Grassland (part)
 Break O'Day Farm
 Washita Battlefield National Historic Site

Demographics

As of the census of 2000, there were 3,436 people, 1,428 households, and 988 families residing in the county.  The population density was 1/km2 (3/mi2).  There were 1,749 housing units at an average density of 1/km2 (2/mi2).  The racial makeup of the county was 91.76% White, 0.29% Black or African American, 5.47% Native American, 0.09% Asian, 0.52% from other races, and 1.86% from two or more races.  2.65% of the population were Hispanic or Latino of any race.

There were 1,428 households, out of which 29.40% had children under the age of 18 living with them, 58.80% were married couples living together, 6.80% had a female householder with no husband present, and 30.80% were non-families. 28.60% of all households were made up of individuals, and 16.90% had someone living alone who was 65 years of age or older.  The average household size was 2.38 and the average family size was 2.91.

In the county, the population was spread out, with 23.80% under the age of 18, 6.70% from 18 to 24, 24.70% from 25 to 44, 26.00% from 45 to 64, and 18.70% who were 65 years of age or older.  The median age was 42 years. For every 100 females there were 100.50 males.  For every 100 females age 18 and over, there were 96.90 males.

The median income for a household in the county was $30,078, and the median income for a family was $35,921. Males had a median income of $22,224 versus $19,821 for females. The per capita income for the county was $16,821.  About 11.50% of families and 16.30% of the population were below the poverty line, including 20.40% of those under age 18 and 10.40% of those age 65 or over.

Economy
The county economy has depended on agriculture, which has benefitted from the fact that it lies above the Ogallala Aquifer. Principal crops have included Kaffir corn, broomcorn, wheat, cotton, corn, and alfalfa. Farms have been consolidating throughout the period since the Great Depression. In 1930,  there were 2,353 farms, averaging 278.3 acres each. By 2000, there were 680 farms, averaging 1,015.54 acres each.

Petroleum and natural gas production has become an important contributor since discovery of the Panhandle-Hugoton Field.

In 2010, Roger Mills County had a per capita income of 28,427 dollars per resident compared to the United States per capita income of 27,334 dollars. The county had the highest per capita income of any in Oklahoma and was the only Oklahoma county in which the per capita income exceeded the national per capita income.

Politics
Roger Mills County is heavily Republican, like most of rural western Oklahoma. It has voted for the Republican candidate in every presidential election since 1980, and in all but three elections since 1952.

Communities

 Berlin
 Cheyenne (county seat)
 Crawford
 Durham
 Grimes
 Hammon
 Rankin
 Reydon
 Roll
 Strong City
 Sweetwater (partially in Beckham County)

See also
 National Register of Historic Places listings in Roger Mills County, Oklahoma

References

External links

 RogerMills.org
 Oklahoma Digital Maps: Digital Collections of Oklahoma and Indian Territory

 
1891 establishments in Oklahoma Territory
Populated places established in 1891